Christian worldview (also called biblical worldview) refers to the framework of ideas and beliefs through which a Christian individual, group or culture interprets the world and interacts with it. Various denominations of Christianity have differing worldviews on some issues based on biblical interpretation, but many thematic elements are commonly agreed-upon within the Christian worldview.

Definition
According to Leo Apostel, a worldview is an ontology, or a descriptive model of the world. It should comprise these six elements:
 An explanation of the world	
 An eschatology, answering the question "where are we heading?"	
 Values, answers to ethical questions: "What should we do?"  In this context, "What would Jesus do?"
 A praxeology, or methodology, or theory of action.: "How should we attain our goals?"
 An epistemology, or theory of knowledge. "What is true and false?" (See, for example John 18:38)
 An etiology. A constructed world-view should contain an account of its own "building blocks," its origins and construction.

Differing Christian worldviews
Different denominations of Christianity have varying worldviews. There are varieties of particulars within the Christian worldview, and disputes of the meaning of concepts in a Christian worldview. Certain thematic elements are common within the Christian worldview. For instance, Northrop Frye indicated as the central clusters of the system of metaphors in the Bible - mountain, garden, and cave. A similar thematic representation of Christian worldview in the Reformed tradition has been formulated as Creation, Fall, Redemption and Consummation.

Worldview vs. doctrine
The U.S. use of the term "worldview" in Christian rhetoric can be traced to the evangelical Reformed philosopher H. Evan Runner of Calvin College in Grand Rapids, Michigan. Runner used the term in his evangelical Reformed community in North America, promoting the worldview concept from a philosophical concept to a synonym for "doctrine."

Key people and literary works within Protestant evangelicalism
 William Lane Craig and J. P. Moreland. Philosophical Foundations for a Christian Worldview. IVP Academic (2003).
 Gordon H. Clark. A Christian View of Men and Things: An Introduction to Philosophy. Grand Rapids, MI: Eerdmans (1951); reprint, Grand Rapids, MI: Baker (1981).
 Herman Dooyeweerd. A New Critique of Theoretical Thought. Jordan Station, Ont.: Paideia Press (1984) online summary with excerpts
 Carl F.H. Henry. God, Revelation, and Authority. Waco, TX: Word (1976).
 Abraham Kuyper. Lectures on Calvinism. Grand Rapids, MI: Eerdmans (1931) online version
 James Orr. The Christian View of God and the World. New York: Charles Scribner's Sons (1893) online version
 Francis Schaeffer. The Complete Works of Francis A. Schaeffer: A Christian Worldview. Wheaton, IL: Crossway (1982).
C. Fred Smith. "Developing a Biblical Worldview: Seeing Things God's Way." Nashville, TN: B and H Academic (2015)

Notes

Other relevant sources
 Jürgen Habermas, The Theory of Communicative Action, Volume II (1981) - see sections on Worldviews and Worldpictures
 Arthur F. Holmes, All Truth Is God's Truth. Grand Rapids, MI: Eerdmans (1977).
 David Naugle,  Worldview: A History of the Concept. Grand Rapids, MI:Eerdmans (2002) on line table of contents
 Nancy Pearcey, Total Truth: Liberating Christianity from its Cultural Captivity. Wheaton, IL: Crossway Books (2004) on line table of contents
 Nancy Pearcey, Saving Leonardo:  A Call to Resist the Secular Assault on Mind, Morals, and Meaning Broadman and Homan Publishing Group (2010), 
Quine, David Answers for Difficult Days: Surviving the Storm of Secularism. Cornerstone Curriculum Project (1998, 2014)
 James Sire, The Universe Next Door: A Basic Worldview Catalog. Downers Grove, IL: InterVarsity Press (1997) on line table of contents
 Ninian Smart, Worldviews: Crosscultural Explorations of Human Belief (New Jersey: Prentice Hall, 2000)
 Albert M. Wolters, Creation Regained: Biblical Basics For A Reformational Worldview. Grand Rapids, MI: Eerdmans (1985).
 Leslie Stevenson, David L. Haberman, "Ten Theories of Human Nature" Oxford University Press (2004) - book examines each one of four points—the nature of the universe, the nature of humanity, the diagnosis of the ills of humanity, and the proposed cure for these problems. Good introduction to where main worldviews originate and how to begin to think about them in context of human nature.
 Graham Cole, "Christians have a Worldview?"

External links

 McKendree R. Langley, "Abraham Kuyper: A Christian Worldview." From the Orthodox Presbyterian Church web site, retrieved September 16, 2006.
 "Worldviews" Website portal dedicated to Christian Worldview and comparative worldviews.

Christian belief and doctrine
Christian terminology